Mike Sadlo (born 19 September 1971) is a German former footballer.

References

External links

Mike Sadlo at Carl Zeiss Jena wiki 

1971 births
Living people
People from Schleiz
People from Bezirk Gera
German footballers
Footballers from Thuringia
Association football forwards
2. Bundesliga players
FC Carl Zeiss Jena players
FC Erzgebirge Aue players
1. FC Lokomotive Leipzig players
German football managers
1. FC Lokomotive Leipzig managers
SG Sonnenhof Großaspach managers
3. Liga managers
1. FC Gera 03 players